Striped ground squirrel may refer to the following squirrels:
The thirteen-lined ground squirrel (Ictidomys tridecemlineatus or Spermophilus tridecemlineatus), a North American species;
Lariscus, a Southeast Asian genus of four species;
Xerus erythropus, an African species.

Animal common name disambiguation pages